A bartizan (an alteration of bratticing), also called a guerite, garita, or échauguette, or spelled bartisan, is an overhanging, wall-mounted turret projecting from the walls of late medieval and early-modern fortifications from the early 14th century up to the 18th century. Most frequently found at corners, they protected a warder and enabled him to see his surroundings. Bartizans generally are furnished with oillets or arrow slits. The turret was usually supported by stepped masonry corbels and could be round, polygonal or square.

Bartizans were incorporated into many notable examples of Scottish Baronial architecture. In the architecture of Aberdeen, the new Town House, built in 1868–74, incorporates bartizans in the West Tower.

Gallery

On walls

On towers

See also 

 Bretèche
 Garret—an attic or top floor room in the military sense; a watchtower from the French word garite

References

Castle architecture
Fortification (architectural elements)
Fortified towers by type